Christiane Krause (born 14 December 1950) is a German athlete who competed mainly in the 100 metres.

She competed for West Germany in the 1972 Summer Olympics held in Munich, Germany in the 4 x 100 metres where she won the gold medal with her teammates Ingrid Becker, Annegret Richter and Heide Rosendahl.

References

West German female sprinters
Olympic gold medalists for West Germany
Athletes (track and field) at the 1972 Summer Olympics
Olympic athletes of West Germany
1950 births
Living people
Medalists at the 1972 Summer Olympics
Olympic gold medalists in athletics (track and field)
Olympic female sprinters